Haryana Legislative Assembly election, 1991 were held in Indian state of Haryana to elect 90 members of the state's legislative assembly. The 90 members were elected by First-past-the-post system from 90 constituencies. Indian National Congress' Bhajan Lal was elected Chief Minister of Haryana after his party gained majority seats.

Results

!colspan=10|
|-
!colspan=2|Party
!Candidates
!Seats won
!Votes
!Vote %
|-
| 
|align="left"|Indian National Congress||90||51||2,084,856||33.73%
|-
| 
|align="left"|Janata Party||88||16||1,361,955||22.03%
|-
| 
|align="left"|Haryana Vikas Party||61||12||775,375||12.54%
|-
| 
|align="left"|Janata Dal||25||3||277,380||4.49%
|-
| 
|align="left"|Bharatiya Janata Party||89||2||582,850||9.43%
|-
| 
|align="left"|Bahujan Samaj Party||26||1||143,611||2.32%
|-
| 
|align="left"|Independents||1412||5||848,527||13.73%
|-
!colspan=2|Total !! 1885 !! 90 !! 6,181,187 !!
|-
|}

Elected members

References

1991
1991
Haryana